Rostam-e Seh Rural District is a rural district (dehestan) in Sorna District, Rostam County, Fars Province, Iran. At the 2006 census, its population was 9,525, in 1,777 families.  The rural district has 17 villages.

References 

Rural Districts of Fars Province
Rostam County